Kanon (カノン) is the bassist of the visual kei rock band An Cafe (アンティック-珈琲店-). After the band went on hiatus in 2010, he started his own label, StudioBlue3, and created a cell phone game called Pinky☆Distortion. He also formed a duo with singer and cellist Kanon Wakeshima, which he named KanonXKanon, in 2010.

An Cafe 
In 2003, Kanon met vocalist Miku and guitarist Bou on the Internet. They formed a band called An Cafe. Teruki, their drummer, joined in 2004 after quitting Feathers-Blue. In 2007, Bou quit the band, and members Takuya and Yuuki joined.

In 2009, the band decided to go on an indefinite hiatus, and on 4 January they performed their last concert at the Nippon Budokan, in Tokyo. Most of them, including Kanon, started new projects. Kanon stated he couldn't just do nothing during the downtime, and had always dreamed of creating a music-themed video game.

References 

Visual kei musicians
Living people
Japanese musicians
Musicians from Chiba Prefecture
Year of birth missing (living people)